The 2005 PDL season was the 11th USL Premier Development League season. The season began in April and ended in August.

Des Moines Menace finished the season as national champions, beating El Paso Patriots 6–5 on penalty kicks, following a 0–0 draw in the PDL Championship game in El Paso, Texas on 13 August 2005.

Orange County Blue Star finished with the best regular season record in the league, winning 15 out of their 16 games, suffering just one loss, and finishing with a +39 goal difference.

Cape Cod Crusaders striker Andy Metcalf and Cocoa Expos forward Frederico Moojen were the league's top scorers, each knocking in 18 goals. Richmond Kickers Future's Christian Neagu led the league with 12 assists, while Orange County Blue Star keeper Nate Pena enjoyed the best goalkeeping statistics, with a goals-against average of 0.466 per game, and keeping 7 clean sheets in his 14 games.

Changes from 2004

Name changes 
Albany Blackwatch Highlanders became Albany Admirals
South Jersey Barons became Ocean City Barons

New franchises 
Seven new teams joined the league this year, including four brand new franchises:

Folding 
Eight teams left the league prior to the beginning of the season:
Chesapeake Dragons – Germantown, Maryland
Columbus Shooting Stars – Columbus, Ohio
Indiana Blast – Indianapolis, Indiana
Jersey Falcons – Jersey City, New Jersey
Lafayette Swamp Cats – Lafayette, Louisiana
New Jersey Stallions – Wayne, New Jersey
St. Louis Strikers – St. Louis, Missouri
Wisconsin Rebels – Menasha, Wisconsin

Standings

Central Conference

Great Lakes Division

Heartland Division

Eastern Conference

Mid Atlantic Division

Northeast Division

Southern Conference

Mid South Division

Southeast Division

Western Conference

Northwest Division

Southwest Division

Playoffs

See also
United Soccer Leagues 2005

External links
2005 Table of Standings

USL League Two seasons
4
3